Băleni is a commune in Galați County, Western Moldavia, Romania with a population of 2,675 people. It is composed of a single village, Băleni.

International relations

Twin towns – Sister cities
Băleni is twinned with:
  Amboise, France

References

Communes in Galați County
Localities in Western Moldavia